Jaat Ko Prashna is a Nepali talk show directed by Shanta Nepali and hosted by Rajesh Hamal. It premiered in 2020 and its premise is about the caste system in Nepal. Soon after its release, Jaat Ko Prashna ran into controversy after being found out that it was being run with help from Christian Aid Nepal. In 2021, the show was selected for the World Justice Challenge 2021.

The season two was released on 2 August 2021.

References

External links
 

2020s Nepalese television series
2020 Nepalese television series debuts
Nepali-language television shows
Television shows filmed in Nepal
Nepalese television talk shows
Kantipur Television series
Hinduism in pop culture-related controversies